The 2018 Dutch Darts Championship was the eleventh of thirteen PDC European Tour events on the 2018 PDC Pro Tour. The tournament took place at the MECC Maastricht, Maastricht, Netherlands from 7–9 September 2018. It featured a field of 48 players and £135,000 in prize money, with £25,000 going to the winner.

Ian White won his tenth PDC title and his first on the European Tour, defeating Ricky Evans 8–5 in the final.

Prize money
This is how the prize money is divided:

Prize money will count towards the PDC Order of Merit, the ProTour Order of Merit and the European Tour Order of Merit, with one exception: should a seeded player lose in the second round (last 32), their prize money will not count towards any Orders of Merit, although they still receive the full prize money payment.

Qualification and format
The top 16 entrants from the PDC ProTour Order of Merit on 30 August will automatically qualify for the event and will be seeded in the second round.

The remaining 32 places will go to players from five qualifying events – 18 from the UK Qualifier (held in Barnsley on 3 September), eight from the West/South European Qualifier (held on 30 August), four from the Host Nation Qualifier (held on 6 September), one from the Nordic & Baltic Qualifier (held on 10 August) and one from the East European Qualifier (held on 25 August).

Mensur Suljović, who would have been the number 3 seed, withdrew from the tournament prior to the draw. Steve West, the highest-ranked qualifier, was promoted to 16th seed. Erik Tautfest also withdrew prior to the draw. Two extra places were made available in the Host Nation Qualifier.

The following players will take part in the tournament:

Top 16
  Michael van Gerwen (second round)
  Peter Wright (semi-finals)
  Ian White (champion)
  Jonny Clayton (second round)
  James Wade (second round)
  Adrian Lewis (quarter-finals)
  Simon Whitlock (quarter-finals)
  Joe Cullen (quarter-finals)
  Daryl Gurney (third round)
  Gerwyn Price (second round)
  Darren Webster (second round)
  Max Hopp (second round)
  Stephen Bunting (second round)
  Mervyn King (third round)
  Dave Chisnall (third round)
  Steve West (second round)

UK Qualifier
  Barrie Bates (second round)
  James Wilson (first round)
  Kevin Painter (second round)
  Ross Smith (third round)
  Arron Monk (second round)
  Andy Boulton (first round)
  Kyle Anderson (quarter-finals)
  Josh Payne (third round)
  Wayne Jones (second round)
  Dawson Murschell (first round)
  William O'Connor (third round)
  Paul Nicholson (first round)
  Ritchie Edhouse (semi-finals)
  Darren Johnson (third round)
  Robert Thornton (first round)
  Ricky Evans (runner-up)
  Ryan Searle (second round)

West/South European Qualifier
  Christian Bunse (first round)
  Rowby-John Rodriguez (second round)
  Kevin Münch (first round)
  Cristo Reyes (second round)
  Toni Alcinas (first round)
  Rusty-Jake Rodriguez (first round)
  Robert Marijanović (first round)

Host Nation Qualifier
  Jan Dekker (first round)
  Jelle Klaasen (first round)
  Jeffrey de Zwaan (first round)
  Dirk van Duijvenbode (first round)
  Vincent van der Voort (first round)
  Jeffrey de Graaf (third round)

Nordic & Baltic Qualifier
  Darius Labanauskas (second round)

East European Qualifier
  Karel Sedláček (first round)

Draw

References

2018 PDC European Tour
2018 in Dutch sport
2018 Dutch Darts Championship
September 2018 sports events in the Netherlands